In Aztec mythology, the Quinametzin populated the world during the previous era of the Sun of Rain (Nahui-Quiahuitl). They were punished by the gods because they did not venerate them, and their peak-civilization came to an end as a result of great calamities and as a punishment from the heavens for grave sins they had committed. The construction of the pyramid of Cholula and the City of Teotihuacan (The Place Where Men Become Gods) was attributed to the Quinametzin Giants.

Names 
 Cuauhtemoc, one of four giants who supported the sky at the beginning of the Fifth Sun.
 Izcoalt, one of four giants who supported the sky at the beginning of the Fifth Sun.
 Izcaqlli, one of four giants who supported the sky at the beginning of the Fifth Sun.
 Tenexuche, one of four giants who supported the sky at the beginning of the Fifth Sun.

 Mixtecatl, a giant founder of Mixteca.
 Otomitl, a giant founder of Xilotepec, Tollan, Otompan.
 Tenoch, a giant founder of Tenochtitlan.
 Ulmecatl, a giant founder of Cuetlachcoapan, Tontonihuacan, Huitzilapan.
 Xelhua, a giant founder of Cuauquechollan, Itzocan, Epatlan, Teopantlan, Tehuacan, Cuzcatlan and Teotitlan, this giant built the great Pyramid of Cholula.
 Xicalancatl, a giant founder of Xicallancatl.

See also 
 Nephilim
 Silver age

References 

Aztec legendary creatures
Aztec mythology and religion
Native American giants